Cnaemidophorus is a genus of plume moths in the family Pterophoridae. It was first described by Hans Daniel Johan Wallengren in 1862.

Species
Cnaemidophorus horribilis Gibeaux, 1996
Cnaemidophorus rhododactyla (Denis & Schiffermüller, 1775) – rose plume moth
Cnaemidophorus smithi Gielis, 1992
Cnaemidophorus urbicella Zagulajev, 2002

References

Platyptiliini
Moth genera
Taxa named by Hans Daniel Johan Wallengren